The Trial of Mary Lincoln is an opera in one act by composer Thomas Pasatieri. Commissioned for television by the National Educational Television network under the leadership of Peter Herman Adler, the work uses an English language libretto by Anne Howard Bailey. Bailey was awarded the Primetime Emmy Award for Outstanding Writing for a Variety Series for her libretto. A work of historical fiction, the opera is based on the life of Mary Todd Lincoln; mainly focusing on the 1875 trial where her sanity was being evaluated.

The Trial of Mary Lincoln premiered on a nationally televised broadcast on February 14, 1972 with Elaine Bonazzi as the title heroine. Kirk Browning directed the production which also starred Wayne Turnage as Robert Todd Lincoln, Carol Bogarde as Elizabeth Todd, Julian Patrick as Lincoln's Clerk, Alan Titus as Mary's nephew, and Chester Watson as Leonard Swett.

See also
Pasatieri's operas Black Widow (1972), The Seagull (1974), Signor Deluso (1974), Frau Margot (2007)

References

1972 operas
One-act operas
Operas for television
Operas set in the 19th century
Operas
Operas based on real people
Operas by Thomas Pasatieri
Fiction set in 1875
Operas set in the United States
Lincoln, Mary
English-language operas